Concorde is a station on Line 1, Line 8 and Line 12 of the Paris Métro. Serving the Place de la Concorde in central Paris, it is located in the 1st arrondissement.

The station was opened on 13 August 1900, almost a month after trains began running on the original section of Line 1 between Porte de Vincennes and Porte Maillot on 19 July 1900. The Line 12 platforms were opened on 5 November 1910 as part of the first section of the Nord-Sud Company's line C from Porte de Versailles to Notre-Dame-de-Lorette. This line was taken over by the Compagnie du chemin de fer métropolitain de Paris and was renamed Line 12 on 27 March 1931.  The Line 8 platforms were opened on 12 March 1914 on the first section of the line from Beaugrenelle (now Charles Michels on Line 10) to Opéra; this line had been opened on 13 July 1913, although the platforms at Concorde and Invalides were not yet finished.

Concorde is distinctive due to its décor created by artist Françoise Schein: she covered the entire station's Line 12 walls with tiles spelling the Déclaration des Droits de l'Homme et du Citoyen of 1789. Ezra Pound's famous Imagist poem, "In a Station of the Metro", was inspired by this station.

Station layout

Places of interest
 The Place de la Concorde is on the right bank of the Seine opposite the French National Assembly, which sits in the Palais Bourbon.
  To the east of the Place is the western end of the Tuileries Gardens, including Galerie nationale du Jeu de Paume and the Musée de l'Orangerie.

Gallery

References
 Roland, Gérard (2003). Stations de métro: D’Abbesses à Wagram. Éditions Bonneton.

External links 

Paris Métro stations in the 1st arrondissement of Paris
Paris Métro stations in the 8th arrondissement of Paris
Railway stations in France opened in 1900